Kramat Station (KMT) is a railway station located in Jalan Percetakan Negara III, Paseban, Senen, Central Jakarta, Indonesia. The station is located in the altitude of 10 meters above sea level. This station is located between Gang Sentiong railway station in the north and Pondok Jati railway station in the south. This station serves Cikarang Loop Line.

The architecture of Kramat Station is simple and modest, an example of small old train station with short partially unroofed platform. Unlike elevated stations between Cikini and Mangga Besar, or newly renovated Palmerah station, Kramat station still retain its old form, a heritage from colonial Dutch East Indies period. The station location is also quite secluded and not located by the main the road.

Previously, at this station, there was a branch line that led to the State Printing Warehouse in Salemba and Salemba Station.

Kramat Station started to be served by Jatiluhur and Walahar Express local trains since 26 October 2019. To support the operation of local trains, small renovations and passenger flow arrangement has been done. However by 2021 timetable, the local train services at this station has been removed.

Building and layout 
This side platform station has two railway lines only and a little bit cramped passenger waiting area.

Services
The following is a list of train services at the Kramat Station.

Passenger services 
 KAI Commuter
  Cikarang Loop Line (Full Racket)

Supporting transportation

References

External links

central Jakarta
Railway stations in Jakarta